Trachycarpus oreophilus, also known as Thai mountain fan palm, is a plant species in the genus Trachycarpus. It is known from two distinct populations, one in northwest Thailand, the other in Manipur in northeastern India. The Manipur population was formerly considered a separate species.

References

oreophilus
Flora of Assam (region)
Trees of Thailand
Plants described in 1997